Vusi Ximba (19392011) was a South African musician, songwriter and comedian and satirist best known for his comic style of music and skit-like performances.

He was born and raised in MSINGA, north of KwaZulu-Natal. He later moved to KwaSwayimane in Pietermaritzburg where he stayed until his death on 2 February 2011.

Controversy and banning
At the height of his career, he was met with controversies relating to the use of indecent language in his music and skit performances. The SABC decided to ban most of his songs from radio stations like Ukhozi FM, which was the only station that could play his genre at that time.

Discography
Therelina (1997)
Umthandazi Ejoyintini (1998)
Govozile EP (2020, posthumous released)

References

Further reading

External links
 

1939 births
2011 deaths
People from Mandeni Local Municipality
Zulu people
South African male comedians
20th-century South African musicians
Comedy musicians
South African satirists